The 2023 Fundidores de Monterrey season is the Fundidores de Monterrey seventh season in the Liga de Fútbol Americano Profesional (LFA) and their fourth under head coach Carlos Strevel.

The Fundidores will come into 2023 as the defending Tazón México champions, after defeating Gallos Negros de Querétaro in the Tazón México V.

The team debuted losing against Reds 15–31.

Draft

Roster

Regular season

Standings

Schedule

References

2023 in American football
Fundidores